Shahababad (also Romanized as Shahābābād; also known as Shāhābād and Shahbābād) is a village in Chahdegal Rural District, Negin Kavir District, Fahraj County, Kerman Province, Iran. At the 2006 census, its population was 363, in 80 families.

References 

Populated places in Fahraj County